Austin Krajicek and Rhyne Williams were the defending champions, but they did not compete.

Bradley Klahn and Adil Shamasdin won the title by defeating Carsten Ball and Matt Reid 7–5, 6–2 in the final.

Seeds

Draw

Draw

References
 Main Draw

Tiburon Challenger - Doubles
2014 Doubles